Tunç Erem (born 1938) is a Turkish academic in international marketing and international trade and strategic management.

Erem was born in İstanbul in 1938. After finishing Robert College High School in İstanbul, he graduated from the college of Business Administration of Roosevelt University, Chicago, Illinois, U.S. in 1962 with a BS degree. He received his doctorate from the Istanbul Academy of Economic and Commercial Sciences in 1968. Erem was awarded the title of associate professor in 1971, and in 1977 a full professorship at the Istanbul Academy of Economic and Commercial Sciences.

Erem's research interests include international marketing, strategic management and international trade. He has represented Turkey at various international conferences pertinent to these research interests, and is the author of numerous articles published in international or national journals or conference proceedings. Erem has also written three books on marketing management.

From 1977 to 1978, Erem was dean of the College of Business Administration of the Istanbul Academy of Economic and Commercial Sciences. Between 1999 and 2002, Erem served as the dean of the Faculty of Economics and Administrative Sciences of Marmara University. He was elected rector by the teaching faculty of the university in June 2002 and remained in office until July 2006 following the election of a successor by the university faculty.

Erem is listed as a member of the Board of Trustees of the American Turkish Friendship Council.

External links
Biography in Turkish
American Turkish Friendship Council Board of Trustees

1938 births
Living people
Turkish business theorists
Turkish social scientists
Turkish non-fiction writers
Roosevelt University alumni
Robert College alumni
Academic staff of Marmara University